Adriano Augusto da Silva (born 15 October 1933) is a Portuguese sailor. He competed in the Flying Dutchman event at the 1968 Summer Olympics.

Notes

References

External links
 
 

1933 births
Living people
Portuguese male sailors (sport)
Olympic sailors of Portugal
Sailors at the 1968 Summer Olympics – Flying Dutchman